Francis Preston (August 2, 1765 – May 26, 1835) was an American lawyer and politician from Abingdon, Virginia. He was the son of Col. William Preston of Virginia, served in both houses of the state legislature, and represented Virginia in the U.S. House of Representatives from 1793 to 1797. Preston had a house built in Abingdon, now called the Martha Washington Inn. In 1795, while residing at Saltville, he constructed the Preston House.

Preston was the father of Isaac Trimble Preston, William Campbell Preston, and John S. Preston and the uncle of William Ballard and William Preston.

Electoral history
1793; Preston was elected to the U.S. House of Representatives defeating Abram Trigg.
1795; Preston was re-elected unopposed.

References

External links
Preston's Congressional biography

1765 births
1835 deaths
Members of the Virginia House of Delegates
Virginia state senators
Virginia lawyers
Politicians from Abingdon, Virginia
Democratic-Republican Party members of the United States House of Representatives from Virginia
Virginia colonial people
People from Saltville, Virginia
19th-century American lawyers
Preston family of Virginia